In Greek mythology, Polydorus (i.e. "many-gift[ed]") or Polydoros referred to several different people.
Polydorus, son of Phineus and Cleopatra, and brother of Polydector (Polydectus). These two sons by his first wife were blinded by Phineus because of the instigation of their stepmother, Idaea who accused them of corrupting her virtue.
Prince Polydorus, son of the King Cadmus and goddess Harmonia, fathered Labdacus by his wife Nycteis.
Polydorus, an Argive, son of Hippomedon and Euanippe, daughter of Elatus. Pausanias lists him as one of the Epigoni, who attacked Thebes in retaliation for the deaths of their fathers, the Seven against Thebes, who died attempting the same thing.
Prince Polydorus, a Trojan, was the King Priam's youngest son.
Polydorus, a Ceteian warrior who participated in the Trojan War. During the siege of Troy, he was killed by Odysseus using his sword along with Aenus, another Ceteian. (Ceteius is called a stream in Asia Minor).
Polydorus (son of Astyanax)
Polydorus, one of the Suitors of Penelope who came from Zacynthus along with other 43 wooers. He, with the other suitors, was shot dead by Odysseus with the assistance of Eumaeus, Philoetius, and Telemachus.

In history, Polydorus was:

Polydorus of Sparta (reigned from c. 741 to c. 665 BC)

In art, Polydorus was:
One of the three Rhodian sculptors who created the sculpture Laocoön and His Sons and signed the Sperlonga sculptures

See also
 Polydora

Notes

References 

 Apollodorus, The Library with an English Translation by Sir James George Frazer, F.B.A., F.R.S. in 2 Volumes, Cambridge, MA, Harvard University Press; London, William Heinemann Ltd. 1921. ISBN 0-674-99135-4. Online version at the Perseus Digital Library. Greek text available from the same website.

 Gaius Julius Hyginus, Fabulae from The Myths of Hyginus translated and edited by Mary Grant. University of Kansas Publications in Humanistic Studies. Online version at the Topos Text Project.
Pausanias, Description of Greece with an English Translation by W.H.S. Jones, Litt.D., and H.A. Ormerod, M.A., in 4 Volumes. Cambridge, MA, Harvard University Press; London, William Heinemann Ltd. 1918. . Online version at the Perseus Digital Library
Pausanias, Graeciae Descriptio. 3 vols. Leipzig, Teubner. 1903.  Greek text available at the Perseus Digital Library.
Quintus Smyrnaeus, The Fall of Troy translated by Way. A. S. Loeb Classical Library Volume 19. London: William Heinemann, 1913. Online version at theio.com
Quintus Smyrnaeus, The Fall of Troy. Arthur S. Way. London: William Heinemann; New York: G.P. Putnam's Sons. 1913. Greek text available at the Perseus Digital Library.
William Smith. A Dictionary of Greek and Roman biography and mythology vs .Polydorus-1, Polydorus-2 & Polydorus-3. London. John Murray: printed by Spottiswoode and Co., New-Street Square and Parliament Street. 1849.

Princes in Greek mythology
People of the Trojan War
Suitors of Penelope
Greek mythology of Thrace
Mythology of Argos
Theban mythology